UFT may stand for:

 Upper fibers of trapezius
 Unified field theory, a theory in physics
 United Faculty of Theology in Melbourne, Victoria
 United Federation of Teachers, a New York union
 Universidade Federal do Tocantins, a Brazilian university
 Finis Terrae University (Universidad Finis Terrae), a Chilean university
 Tegafur/uracil, a chemotherapy drug used in the treatment of cancer
 Ultimate Family Tree, a discontinued genealogy program from Ancestry.com
 Micro Focus Unified Functional Testing, a testing and quality assurance software solution